Jeddore is a L'nu (Mi'kmaq) surname, that has also led to placenames in the Canadian provinces of Nova Scotia and Newfoundland and Labrador.

History
The earliest instance of the surname Jeddore known to date is Kji-Saqamaw We'jitu Isidore, (circa 1656-1769). (Saqamaw means "Chief"; Kji-Saqamaw means "Grand Chief").

The contemporary surname Isidore may also be related to Kji-Saqamaw We'jitu Isidore.

People
People commonly known by their family name Jeddore (in rare instances written as Jedor(e), Ledor(e), Geodol, Gietol and Gadole, include:

 Noel Jeddore (1810 - 1898)
 Joseph Jeddore (Abt. 1866 - April 11, 1956)
 John Denny Jeddore (August 1887 - October 14, 1953)
 Peter Jeddore (May 9, 1892 - May 18, 1970)
 Saqamaw Noel Jeddore (December 18, 1865 - May 14, 1944)
 Victor Jeddore (August 11, 1907 - July 7, 1977)
 Lawrence Jeddore (November 4, 1922 - 1998)
 We'jitu Jeddore (AKA We'jitu Isidore,  - ), grand chief of the Mi'kmaq of the provinces of New Brunswick, Newfoundland and Labrador, Nova Scotia and Quebec.

Locations carrying the Jeddore name
 East Jeddore, Nova Scotia
 West Jeddore, Nova Scotia
 Jeddore Oyster Pond, Nova Scotia
 Head of Jeddore, Nova Scotia
 Jeddore Lake, Newfoundland and Labrador

See also
 Jeddore (disambiguation)

External links
 Description of East and West Jeddore

Surnames